Raymond Leonard (born 1941) is Emeritus Professor of  Industrial Technology at Manchester University, known for both his scientific and literary work.

Early life
Raymond Leonard was born in 1941 when the Manchester Blitz was at its height. His father, William was a railway worker and his mother, Florence, was a hospital cleaner. Having attended Saint Phillip's Junior School he moved to the Cavendish School in the heart of Manchester, where he finished top of the class. While at school, to supplement the family income, he delivered newspapers both night and morning around central Manchester including Sundays. He also had a stall on spare land selling fruit and vegetables on Saturdays. Having left school before his fifteenth birthday he began an apprenticeship at Crossley engines in Manchester. Here he won a state scholarship in 1961 to take a degree in Mechanical Engineering. His father died when he was 14, and his mother died when he was 19. He had no brothers or sisters. It was during these early years that Leonard developed his lifelong interest in science, religion and their complementary interactions.

Scientific career
Having graduated with B.Sc and Ph.D degrees from Salford University, Leonard enjoyed a career in marine diesel industry before joining the University of Manchester (UMIST) in 1971. Here his initial research concerned manufacturing systems, particularly with reference to cellular manufacturing. This work was extended to include computer aided manufacturer, computer aided design, and manufacturing control. This later evolved into computer integrated manufacturing. The resulting publications were contained in a successful submission for the degree of Doctor of Science, D.Sc, in 1987. Later research related to an approach for diminishing Halon gas emissions into the atmosphere, which became widely used to safe ground the ozone layer. The department that Leonard established helped UMIST to gain the Queen's Anniversary Prize (1998), and he was the Senior Academic in the presentation party. Over the past 40 years he has given keynote lectures around the world, published in excess of 200 research papers, supervised over 150 research degrees in engineering, science and industrial management and co-authored two academic books.

Publications

Non-fiction
How to Avoid the British Disease (with J.A Chatterton, Northgate Publishing, 1979)
Technology and Production (with G Clews, Philip Allan, 1985)

Fiction
The Nostradamus Inheritance (1985). London: Poplar, 1985. 
OMEGA (1986).  London: Poplar, 1986. 
Legacy of the Shroud (1988).  W.H. Allen, 1988. 

Poetry
 Pearls Along The Path, a collection of Professor Leonard's published poetry. 2011

Awards
Queen's Anniversary Prize, 1999. The Royal Anniversary Trust, www.royalanniversarytrust.org.uk

References

External links
  Prof. Leonard's home page

20th-century British novelists
British scientists
Engineers from Manchester
Living people
1941 births
Academics of the University of Manchester
Alumni of the University of Salford
Academics of the University of Manchester Institute of Science and Technology
British male novelists
20th-century British male writers